The Form III Certificate was an academic qualification in Mauritius awarded upon successful completion of lower secondary school. The exam last took place at the end of 2019 and was replaced by the National Certificate of Education (NCE) in 2020.  The qualification was awarded upon earning passing marks on the National Assessment at Form III exams, taken by Grade 9 at  secondary school, which are administered by the Mauritius Examinations Syndicate.

Progression

Form III marked the end of compulsory education, and students are not obligated to continue their studies beyond this point. Form III also marked the completion of lower secondary education. Students who successfully earned the Form III Certificate may then progress onto higher secondary education. They may have then studied for the O-level examinations and earn the School Certificate. Students who were unsuccessful in obtaining the qualification may have then transitioned from the academic stream to the vocational stream and progress onto vocational programs of study.

See also 
 Education in Mauritius
 Certificate of Primary Education
 School Certificate (Mauritius)
 Higher School Certificate (Mauritius)

References 

Education in Mauritius
Secondary school qualifications